Ruili Fashion Pioneer or Ruili shishang xianfeng, also known as Ray Li Fashion Pioneer, was a fashion magazine launched in March 1999 under the original name Ruili Cute Pioneer (瑞丽可爱先锋), which was changed to its current name in January 2005.

Discontinued
In January 2016, the printed version of the magazine ceased publication, but its electronic version is retained. A commentator pointed out that the suspension of Ruili Fashion Pioneer was a case of print media being defeated by the new media.

References

1999 establishments in China
2016 disestablishments in China
Chinese-language magazines
Defunct magazines published in China
Fashion magazines published in China
Magazines established in 1999
Magazines disestablished in 2016
Magazines published in Beijing